Hareide is a Norwegian surname. Notable people with the surname include:

Åge Hareide (born 1953), Norwegian footballer and manager
Bodolf Hareide (born 1937), Norwegian politician
Dag Hareide (born 1949), Norwegian humanist and writer
Einar Hareide (politician) (1899–1983), Norwegian politician
Einar Hareide (designer) (born 1959), Norwegian industrial designer
Gustav Hareide (born 1950), Norwegian politician
Jorunn Hareide (born 1940), Norwegian literary historian
Knut Arild Hareide (born 1972), Norwegian politician

Norwegian-language surnames